"If Crimson Was Your Colour" is a single of the Swedish doom metal band Witchcraft released by Rise Above Records in 2006. Both tracks were previously unreleased.

Pressing information
The single was originally released on red vinyl, clear vinyl and black vinyl. In 2007, it was repressed on green vinyl, blue vinyl and brown vinyl. According to Rise Above, the following quantities were printed:

Original press
 225 black vinyl
 525 clear vinyl
 336 red vinyl

Repress
 100 blue vinyl
 200 green vinyl
 200 brown vinyl

Track listing
 "If Crimson Was Your Colour" – 3:54
 "I Know You Killed Someone" – 3:38

References

2006 songs
Rise Above Records albums